Blues Breakers, colloquially known as The Beano Album, is the debut studio album by the English blues rock band John Mayall & the Bluesbreakers, originally credited to John Mayall with Eric Clapton. Produced by Mike Vernon and released in 1966 by Decca Records (UK) and London Records (US), it pioneered a guitar-dominated blues-rock sound.

The album was commercially successful and most critics viewed it positively. In 2003 and 2012, Rolling Stone ranked it number 195 on its list of the "500 Greatest Albums of All Time". It was voted number 391 in Colin Larkin's All Time Top 1000 Albums (2000).

Background
After the release of the Mayall's first album, the live John Mayall Plays John Mayall, Eric Clapton joined the group as the lead guitarist. Mayall originally intended for his second album to be also a live one in order to capture the guitar solos performed by Clapton. A set was recorded at the Flamingo Club, with Jack Bruce (with whom Clapton would subsequently work in Cream) on bass. The recordings, however, were of bad quality and were not used, although one song, "Stormy Monday" was included on Mayall's retrospective Looking Back (1969).

Recording
With the original plan of a live album now discarded, John Mayall & the Bluesbreakers recorded Blues Breakers at Decca Studios, West Hampstead, London in May 1966. The guitar that Eric Clapton used during these sessions was a sunburst 1960 Gibson Les Paul Standard with two PAF humbucking pickups. This guitar was stolen in 1966; its whereabouts remain unknown. However, blues-rock guitarist Joe Bonamassa claims to have been told the guitar is in a private collection in the eastern United States. Bonamassa also asserts that the guitar is a 1959 rather than 1960 model. The guitar became known as the "Blues Breaker" or "Beano" Les Paul and a replica was issued by Gibson in 2012. Critics consider Clapton's guitar tone and playing on this album to be influential in the artistic and commercial development of rock-styled guitar playing.

The band on this album includes Mayall on piano, Hammond organ, harmonica, and most vocals; bassist John McVie; drummer Hughie Flint; and Clapton. Augmenting the band on this album was a horn section added during post-production, with Alan Skidmore, Johnny Almond, and Derek Healey.

Musical style
The album consists of blues standards by well-known artists, such as Otis Rush, Freddie King and Robert Johnson, as well as a few originals penned by Mayall and Clapton. Most tracks serve as a showcase for Clapton's playing. Although he provided some co- and backing vocals with his former group, the Yardbirds, "Ramblin' on My Mind" is Clapton's first solo lead vocal to be recorded.

Artwork
The album is often called The Beano Album by fans because of its cover photograph showing Eric Clapton reading The Beano, a British children's comic. Clapton stated in his autobiography that he was reading The Beano on the cover because he felt like being "uncooperative" during the photo shoot. David Wedgbury took the photograph near the Old Kent Road.

Reception

It was voted number 391 in the third edition of Colin Larkin's All Time Top 1000 Albums (2000). In 2003 the album was ranked number 195 on Rolling Stone magazine's list of The 500 Greatest Albums of All Time, maintaining the rating in a 2012 revised list.

Robert Dimery included the album in his book 1001 Albums You Must Hear Before You Die.  Apart from being one of the most influential blues albums, it also started the now-iconic combination of a Gibson Les Paul guitar through an overdriven Marshall Bluesbreaker amplifier.

Track listing

Original album
Details taken from the original London Records (US) LP record album (the Decca (UK) album does not list running times); other releases may show different information.

1998 remastered European reissue on the Deram label
Includes all tracks in both mono and stereo: 1–12 as above in mono, 13–24 as 1–12 above in stereo. Also issued by Universal Japan, on the Decca label, in 2001.

2001 American reissue on the Deram label
Also includes two bonus tracks from a 1966 UK single on Purdah Records:
"Lonely Years" (Mayall) – 3:21
"Bernard Jenkins" (Clapton) – 3:48

40th anniversary Deluxe Edition (Decca) (2006)
Disc one
1–12: original album in mono
13–24: original album in stereo
Disc two
<li>"Crawling up a Hill" (Mayall) – 2:08
<li>"Crocodile Walk" (Mayall) – 2:23
<li>"Bye Bye Bird" (Sonny Boy Willamson, Willie Dixon) – 2:49
<li>"I'm Your Witchdoctor" (Mayall) – 2:11
<li>"Telephone Blues" (Mayall) – 3:57
<li>"Bernard Jenkins" (Clapton) – 3:49
<li>"Lonely Years" (Mayall) – 3:19
<li>"Cheatin' Woman" (Mayall) – 2:03
<li>"Nowhere to Turn" (Mayall) – 1:42
<li>"I'm Your Witchdoctor" (Mayall) – 2:10
<li>"On Top of the World (Stereo mix)" (Mayall) – 2:34
<li>"Key to Love" (Mayall) – 2:02
<li>"On Top of the World" (Mayall) – 2:34
<li>"They Call It Stormy Monday" (T-Bone Walker) – 4:35
<li>"Intro into Maudie" (John Lee Hooker, Mayall) – 2:27
<li>"It Hurts to Be in Love" (Dixon, Toombs) – 3:22
<li>"Have You Ever Loved a Woman" (Myles) – 6:44
<li>"Bye Bye Bird" (Williamson, Dixon) – 3:51
<li>"Hoochie Coochie Man" (Dixon) – 3:53
Recording locations (disc two)
1–3: BBC Saturday Club session
4–7: appeared as singles (A and B sides)
8–10: BBC Saturday Club session
11: unreleased track (stereo mix)
12–13: BBC Saturday Club session
14: live track from Looking Back
15–19: live tracks from Primal Solos

Personnel
Blues Breakers
 John Mayall – vocals, piano, organ, harmonica
 Eric Clapton – guitar, vocals on "Ramblin' on My Mind"
 John McVie – bass guitar
 Hughie Flint – drums
Horn section on tracks 7, 9, 11
 Alan Skidmore – tenor saxophone
 Johnny Almond – baritone saxophone (also on track 5)
 Derek Healey – trumpet

Additional musicians
 Geoff Krivit – guitar (disc two tracks 8–10, not featured on original album)
 Jack Bruce – bass (disc two tracks 14–19, not featured on original album)

Production
 Gus Dudgeon – engineer
 Mike Vernon – producer

Charts

Certifications

References

Sources

Hjort, Christopher (2007): Strange Brew: Eric Clapton and the British Blues Boom 1965–1970. Jawbone Press. ISBN 978-1-906002-00-8

External links
 

1966 debut albums
John Mayall & the Bluesbreakers albums
Deram Records albums
Albums produced by Mike Vernon (record producer)
Decca Records albums
London Records albums
Eric Clapton albums